"The Hardest Part" is a 1979 song by the American new wave band Blondie. In North America, it was released as the second single from the band's fourth album Eat to the Beat (in Europe, "Union City Blue" was released as the second single). It was written by the group's principal songwriting partnership, Deborah Harry and Chris Stein. The single achieved minor success, reaching #84 and #86 on the Billboard Hot 100 and RPM 100 Singles respectively.

Overview
The song describes an armored car robbery. The title refers to the "hardest part" of the plan – progressing past several armed guards. It would be revealed much later in an interview, that the original working title for this song was The Stiffest Piece.

Reception
Billboard considered "The Hardest Part" to be the best song on Eat to the Beat, describing it as "a solid rock - disco number featuring...icily effective vocals" and containing an "infectious" hook.  Cash Box said it has a "harder-edged groove" than "Dreaming" and Uses "lyrical imagery of an armored car heist." Record World said that the "powerful rock dance beat & Harry's vocals are
superb."

Music video
As with all songs on the album, a music video was produced to promote the single. It features Debbie Harry in a long dark wig wearing a dress designed by Anya Phillips, who also designed the pink dress featured on the cover of the band's 1977 album "Plastic Letters". The video was directed by David Mallett and featured a setting graffitied by Jean-Michel Basquiat, Lee Quiñones, and Fab 5 Freddy.

Track listing
US 7"  (CHS 2408, February 1980)
"The Hardest Part" (Deborah Harry, Chris Stein) – 3:42
"Sound-A-Sleep" (Deborah Harry, Chris Stein) – 4:18

Chart performance

References

Blondie (band) songs
1980 singles
Songs written by Debbie Harry
Songs written by Chris Stein
Song recordings produced by Mike Chapman
Chrysalis Records singles
1979 songs